Dast Feshad (also Romanized as Dast Feshād and Dastfeshād; also known as Dasht Feshād) is a village in Ghazali Rural District, Miyan Jolgeh District, Nishapur County, Razavi Khorasan Province, Iran. At the 2006 census, its population was 182, in 47 families.

References 

Populated places in Nishapur County